Vernon Darrell Burch (born 1955) is an American R&B/soul singer and guitarist.

Biography
In 1975, Burch signed to United Artists, where he released his first album, I'll Be Your Sunshine. Later, he moved to Columbia Records and then Chocolate City Records, which was distributed by Casablanca Records and Filmworks. He later recorded for Spector.

Two of his singles, "Changes (Messin' with My Mind)" in 1975 and "Do It to Me" in 1981, made it into the Billboard R&B top 20 chart. Burch's other singles include "Brighter Days", "Steppin' Out", "Love Is", "Never Can Find a Way (Hot Love)", "Once Again in My Life", "Get Up" and "Fun City".

His song "Get Up" was made famous by being sampled by the 1990s pop group Deee-Lite, with their biggest hit "Groove is in the Heart".

Discography

Studio albums
I'll Be Your Sunshine (1975)
When I Get Back Home (1977)
Love-A-Thon (1978)
Get Up (1979)
Stepping Out (1980)
Playing Hard to Get (1982)

References
[ Allmusic entry]

American soul musicians
1957 births
Living people
Musicians from Washington, D.C.